The Duchess of Plakendia (Greek: I doukissa tis Plakentias) is a 1956 Greek historical drama film directed by Maria Plyta and starring Rita Myrat, Voula Harilaou and Alekos Deligiannis.

Cast
 Rita Myrat as Sofia  
 Voula Harilaou as Sofia's Daughter  
 Alekos Deligiannis
 Thodoros Moridis 
 Labros Konstadaras 
 Mihalis Bouhlis 
 Dimitris Nikolaidis
 Hristos Apostolou 
 Kostas Baladimas 
 Stavros Christofides 
 Despo Diamantidou 
 Tasos Gouvas 
 Mihalis Iakovidis
 Mirka Kalatzopoulou 
 Giannis Kandilas 
 Labros Kotsiris 
 Dimitris Koukis 
 Elli Koutouvali 
 Kostis Leivadeas 
 Vassilis Mavromatis 
 Spyros Olybios 
 Alkis Papas 
 Eftyhia Pavlogianni 
 Yorgos Ploutis 
 Dionysia Roi 
 Giorgos Rois 
 Mimis Rougeris 
 Lelos Savvopoulos 
 Mimis Savvopoulos 
 Andreas Stagias 
 Tzeni Tsakiri

References

Bibliography
 Vrasidas Karalis. A History of Greek Cinema. A&C Black, 2012.

External links
 

1956 films
1950s historical drama films
1950s Greek-language films
Greek drama films
Films directed by Maria Plyta
1956 drama films
Greek black-and-white films